Loneliest Leader is a series directed by Mahdi Fakhimzade. This series narrates a short part of Hasan Ibn Ali's life, Hasan-Muawiya treaty and the conditions of the Islamic community and Shia and the events after his killing. In short, this series has also been produced in the form of a film.

Plot 
The loneliest Leader deals with the last 6 months of Hasan Mojtaba's life, which ends with his martyrdom. Fakhimzadeh begins his story from the place where, at the same time as the martyrdom of Ali, another Kharijite, he intends to kill Muawiya, but fails to do so.  The events after assassination of Ali, the story of Hasan-Muawiya treaty, as well as the conditions of the Islamic community and the Shia after his assassination are among the issues raised in this series.

Cast 
 Akbar Zanjanpour in the role of Muawiya also in Imam Ali Series
Davoud Rashidi in the role of Amr ibn al-As
 Husayn Gil in the role of Ibn Abbas
 Mehdi Fakhimzadeh in the role of Shmir
 Afsaneh Bayegan in the role of Ja'da bint al-Ash'at
 Kazem HajirAzad
 Fathali Oveisi

Music 
Majid Entezami (The composer of this series) has made four track for this series.

See also 

 Imam Ali Series
Mukhtarnameh
 List of Islamic films

References

External links 
 

Television series about Islam
Iranian television series
1990s Iranian television series